Dhawa is the gram Panchayat & Panchayat samiti and Dhawa is a town in Luni tehsil in Jodhpur district of the Indian state of Rajasthan. It is located 42 km South from Jodhpur district headquarters.22 km from Luni. 374 km from State capital Jaipur.

Overview
Dhawa is village a located on Jodhpur-Barmer highway. The population of dhawa is about 7000. A government senior secondary school is located in dhawa, but no science subject is available. A government hospital is located in dhawa. a vatenary hospital also in dhawa

Demographic
Hindi and Rajasthani is the Local Language.

City
Dhawa has a big market,where every types of shop is available.There are three Petrol Pump.

Hotels
Dhawa is famous for "Dal ke Pakode".
Jain Hotel is famous & Magravati resort is 3-star hotel on NH 25.

By Rail
There is no railway station near to Dhawa in less than 10 km. How ever Jodhpur Jn Rail Way Station is major railway station 41 km near to Dhawa.

Villages in Dhawa Gram Panchayat

References

External links
 
 https://web.archive.org/web/20130523045929/http://jodhpur.nic.in/

Cities and towns in Jodhpur district